Miller Harris is a London-based luxury perfume brand founded by perfumer Lyn Harris in 2000. In 2012 Harris sold a stake in the company, with The Daily Telegraph later noting that Miller Harris had come "to a major player in the world of independent fragrance".

Miller Harris has two London stores, in Seven Dials and Covent Garden.

, Miller Harris have opened 8 shops in other countries, in Hong Kong and China.

In 2010, the business received a boost in awareness to its niche clientele when Michelle Obama was gifted a set of candles by the then UK Prime Minister David Cameron and his wife Samantha Cameron, on their first trip to meet President Barack Obama in Washington.

From 2010 through to 2020, Miller Harris have continued to launch fragrances with the Robertet, the French fragrance house, adding bestselling lines such as Lumière Dorée and Étui Noir. In 2018, the brand launched the now bestselling fragrance Scherzo. Based on a page torn out of the novel Tender is the Night, by F. Scott Fitzgerald, and given to perfumer Mathieu Nardin. The resulting fragrance was, in 2020, claimed by Grazia to be one of the 10 cult perfumes, taking the planet by storm.

In 2020, Miller Harris gave all the hand wash and soap in its warehouse to Age UK in response to the COVID-19 pandemic.

References

External links
Official Website

Fragrance companies
Companies based in London
2000 establishments in England